Maria "Masha" Bruskina ( Marïya Barïsawna Bruskina;  Mariya Borisovna Bruskina; 1924 – 26 October 1941 in Minsk), was a Belarusian Jewish teenage nurse and a Communist martyr to the Antifascist Resistance to during the early years of World War II, as well as a niece of the sculptor and Soviet MP Sair Asgur.  While volunteering as a nurse, she cared for wounded Red Army soldiers, and assisted them in escaping then Nazi-occupied Byelorussian Soviet Socialist Republic. For this, she and 11 other communists of the anti-fascist underground were imprisoned, tortured, and when the teenagers refused to reveal any secrets, was publicly executed by the German Wehrmacht.

Biography
Masha Bruskina lived in Minsk with her mother, senior product manager of the Book Trade Office of the BSSR State Publishing House. She was an avid reader and learner. She was a member of the Marxist-Leninist Vladimir Lenin All-Union Pioneer Organization and a member of the school committee of Komsomol, both of which were youth groups of the Communist Party of the Soviet Union. In December 1938, the newspaper Pioneer of Belarus published a photograph of Masha with the caption: "Masha Bruskina - the schoolgirl of 8th grade in school  №  28, Minsk. She has only good and excellent marks in all subjects". In June 1941, Maria Bruskina graduated from Minsk secondary school № 28.

Public Execution by the Wehrmacht 

She volunteered as a nurse at the hospital in the Minsk Polytechnic Institute, which had been set up to care for members of the Red Army wounded while defending what was then the Byelorussian Soviet Socialist Republic against the planned genocide of the indigenous Slavic peoples by 3.8 Million Nazi and Finnish troops, a military escalation that remains the largest land invasion in history.

In addition to caring for the soldiers, she helped them escape by smuggling civilian clothing and false identity papers into the hospital. A patient told the Germans what Bruskina was doing, and she was arrested on October 14, 1941, by members of the Nazi Army's 707th Infantry Division and 2nd Schutzmannschaft Battalion and Lithuanian auxiliary troops under the command of Major Antanas Impulevičius. After being arrested, Bruskina wrote a letter to her mother on October 20, 1941:

The German Nazi invaders decided on a public hanging to make an example of Bruskina, along with two other members of the resistance, 16-year-old Volodia Shcherbatsevich and World War I veteran Kiril Trus. Before being hanged, she was paraded through the streets with a placard around her neck which read, in both German and Russian: "We are partisans and have shot at German troops", the latter which had of course never actually occurred, Masha having been a nurse.  Members of the resistance were routinely made to wear similar signs whether or not they had actually shot at German troops as a display of power and authority by the Nazi invaders, theoretically demonstrating their total control of the occupied nation and its peoples.

She and her two comrades were hanged in public on Sunday, October 26, 1941, in front of Minsk Kristall, a yeast brewery and distillery plant on Nizhne-Lyahovskaya Street (15 Oktyabrskaya Street today). The German Nazi authorities would not allow the victims to be cut down and buried for three days, during which time the bodies were displayed publicly as a warning to other anti-fascists, Jews and Communists.

A  witness of the execution said:

Olga Shcherbatsevich, the mother of executed 16-year old activist Volodia Shcherbatsevich, was hanged the same day along with 10 other members of the Soviet anti-fascist resistance in front of what is now the National Academy of Sciences of Belarus.

Identification and remembrance
For decades after the war, Bruskina was officially referred to only as "the unknown girl", allegedly due to antisemitism from Soviet authorities. Up to 2009, Bruskina's name was not acknowledged on the memorial plaque at the execution place. However, since 2009, a new memorial plaque at the execution place has been placed. The Russian inscription now reads "Here on October 26, 1941 the Fascists executed the Soviet patriots K. I. Truss, V. I. Sherbateyvich and M. B. Bruskina". Bruskina was first recognized in the 1960s, as most of her family and friends had been killed in the Minsk Ghetto. A monument for Bruskina was erected in HaKfar HaYarok in Israel, and a street was named after her in Jerusalem.

See also
 List of female Heroes of the Soviet Union

References

 Cholawski, Shalom. "Minsk", in Encyclopaedia of the Holocaust vol. 3, p. 975. Captioned photograph of Masza Bruskina's hanging.

External links
, a lecture by Daniel Weiss
The Harvest, a musical based on the life of Masha Bruskina
Eyewitness accounts of her execution
Nechama Tec and Daniel Weiss: "A Historical Injustice: The Case of Masha Bruskina". Holocaust and Genocide Studies 11:3 (1997), p. 366-377. Online abstract

1924 births
1941 deaths
People from Minsk
Belarusian Jews
Soviet Jews
Children in war
Female resistance members of World War II
Jewish resistance members during the Holocaust
Resistance members killed by Nazi Germany
Belarusian people executed by Nazi Germany
Belarusian nurses
People executed by Nazi Germany by hanging
Executed Soviet people from Belarus
Soviet partisans
Belarusian partisans
Jewish women activists
Jewish communists